Gajah (Elephant) is the second studio album by Indonesian singer-songwriter Tulus. The album was released on February 19, 2014, by Demajors. The album occupied the eighth position in iTunes Indonesia in July. A few months after release, the single "Gajah" entered the charts in Indonesia. "Sepatu" had re-released single for Japanese' version "Kutsu" (セパトゥ〜くつ〜) and lyrically had translated by Hiroaki Kato, a Japanese artist. Other singles from the album were "1000 Tahun Lamanya" and "Jangan Cintai Aku Apa Adanya".

The songs were written by Tulus, except "Baru", written by Tulus and Ferry Nurhayat. Gajah was listed to entering for Top 9 Indonesian Album by Indonesian Tempo magazine.

The album won two awards (Best of the Best Album and Best Pop Album) at the 2015 Anugerah Musik Indonesia. The album was nominated for "Album of the Year" at the 1st Indonesian Choice Awards, but lost to Raisa' Heart to Heart.

Track listing

Commercial responses
The single "Sepatu" as released on iTunes on August 22, 2013. The song received positive reviews and sold well on iTunes.

The album Gajah was launched on February 19, 2014, through iTunes and physical release on CD. The album received positive reviews, selling 5,000 copies in its first week and 60,000 copies in the first two months, the best selling album from Demajors since Endah N Rhesa, which sold 30,000 copies.

Personnel
 Tulus – lead vocals, lyrics, co-producer
 Riri Muktamar – executive producer
 Ari Renaldi – producer, mixing, mastering, arranger, arasemen, drums, piano, percussion, and keyboard
 Rudy Zulkarnaen – arranger (track no 5), arasemen (track no 5), bass, contrabass
 Yonathan Godjali – daras music idea (track no 6)
 Topan Abimanyu – guitar (track no 2, 3, 4, 6, 7, 8, 9)
 Anto Arief – guitar (track no 1)
 Brury Effendi – trumpet, flugethorn
 Matt Ashworth – saxophone
 Raga Dipa Eka Kirana – violin
 Laksmitada Dewi Nurul Qolbiah – violin
 Tommy Ilham Junaedi – violin
 Andan Adrian – cello
 Ammy Kurniawan – guitar (track no 8)
 Ferry Nurhayat – backing vocal (track no 1, 7, 8)
 Lia Amalia – backing vocal (track no 7, 8)

Awards and nominations

References

2014 albums
Indonesian-language albums